Cardinalidae (often referred to as the "cardinal-grosbeaks" or simply the  "cardinals") is a family of New World-endemic passerine birds that consists of cardinals, grosbeaks, and buntings. It also includes several birds such as the tanager-like Piranga and the warbler-like Granatellus. As such, membership of this group is not easily defined by a single or even a set of physical characteristics, but instead by molecular work. In general they are medium to large songbirds with stout features, some with large heavy bills. 

Members of this group are beloved for their brilliant red, yellow, or blue plumages seen in many of the breeding males in this family. Most species are monogamous breeders that nest in open-cup nests, with many taking turn incubating the nest and taking care of their young. Most are arboreal species though the dickcissel is a ground-dwelling prairie bird. 

Conservation-wise most members of this family are considered least concern by the IUCN Red List though a few like the Carrizal seedeater and black-cheeked ant tanager are listed as critically endangered and endangered respectively. Studies on the effects of climate change on species has suggested many more might be threatened with extinction in the near future. However, some species such as the northern cardinal have been expanding their range within the last century.

Field characteristics

The grosbeaks, seedeaters, and cardinals have large bills, while Granatellus and buntings have small bills. The cardinalid tanagers have stout, near pointed bills, with some species of Piranga having serrations along the edge of their upper bills. This bill shape is not always an indicator of relationships, as the various species of blue cardinalid species, like the blue grosbeak and Cyanoloxia grosbeaks are related to the buntings. Similarly the cardinalid tanagers are closer to the cardinals and masked grosbeaks (see more in the systematics section). The head is medium to large in size, with a medium neck length. The body of cardinalids ranges from small to medium with lengths of 4.5 to 11 in (11 to 28 cm). Legs are also short to medium in length. The wings are medium and pointed. Cardinalids have nine visible primary feathers with the tenth primary feather being short in comparison. The plumages in cardinalids are sexually dichromatic as many males of various species display bright reds, oranges, blues or blacks. In most temperate species males will undergo molting between seasons so that non-breeding males will either resemble the females of their species or in-between the two. These species such as the indigo bunting will exhibit a complex molt cycle where they go through four different stages of plumage coverage within their first year of life. In the spring to summer birds start with juvenile plumage to supplemental plumage, then to a first basic (nonbreeding) plumage in the fall to winter and finally the first alternate (breeding) plumage. Adults will typically have the basic two molt cycle from alternate to basic or partial (late summer or fall) to back again in the spring. Males of tropical species will have the same coloration year-round. Females of all species are either drabber in coloration by comparison, either a lighter coloration of the males, with oranges, greens or yellows. The molting pattern in most cardinalids exhibits delayed plumage maturation, so that often the first- year male birds would be in non-breeding plumage or at an intermediate stage. The molting pattern in cardinalids is divided into two types. A preformative molt is a partial molt where only the body feathers get replaced, but not the wing and tail feathers, which is seen in a lot of temperate and neotropical species. The second type is an eccentric preformative molt when only the outer primary and inner secondaries are replaced. This molt is seen in some species of Cyanoloxia and Passerina.

Systematics
Traditionally members of this group were classified as a tribe of the finch family Fringillidae (Cardinalini) characterized by heavy, conical, seed-crushing bills. The group consisted of the genera Pheucticus, Parkerthraustes, Saltator, Spiza, Cyanocompsa, Cyanoloxia, Porphyrospiza, Passerina, Caryothraustes, Periporphyrus, Rhodothraupis, and Cardinalis. The issue that taxonomists had faced, however, was there was no unifying morphological traits that were congruent in various studies. In 2007 a mitochondrial DNA study by Klicka, Burns and Spellman sampling all of the aforementioned genera and 34 of the 42 species found that the genera Parkerthraustes, Saltator, and Porphyrospiza were not members of the cardinal-lineage, but instead are found throughout in the tanager-lineage (Thraupidae). Interestingly enough the genera classified as thraupids at the time, Piranga, Habia, Chlorothraupis, and Amaurospiza, are found to be part of cardinalid radiation. In addition the genus Granatellus, originally classified as a parulid warbler, are also found to be part of Cardinalidae. The authors have found that with this new relationship Cardinalidae can be classified into five subgroups, which have been supported by subsequent studies. The five subclades consists of the Habia lineage (Habia and Chlorothraupis), the “masked” lineage (Piranga, Caryothraustes, Periporphyrus, Rhodothraupis, and Cardinalis), the Granatellus lineage, the “blue” lineage (Cyanocompsa, Amaurospiza, Cyanoloxia, Passerina, and Spiza), and the Pheucticus lineage. These subclades and membership of these genera have been widely supported in subsequent studies. In a 2021 paper by Guallar et al. found based on the preformative molting pattern of cardinalids suggested the ancestor of this group was a forest-dwelling bird that dispersed into open habitats on numerous occasions.

The cardinalids are part of a larger grouping of American endemic songbirds, Emberizoidea, which also includes the aforementioned thraupids and parulids, as well as icterids (New World blackbirds), passerellids (New World sparrows), and several families that contain one or a couple of genera. Several studies have placed cardinalids as either the sister group to Thraupidae, Mitrospingidae (a small family whose genera were formerly classified as thraupids), or the sister to a clade containing thraupids and mitrospingids. At least one study suggested that cardinalids could treated as a subfamily of Thraupidae.

Phylogeny
Phylogeny of the cardinalid genera after Klicka et al. (2007).

Species list
These 53 species and 14 genera are recognized by the IOC as of January 2023:

Natural history

Habitat, distribution and migration
The cardinalids can be found from Canada to northern Argentina and Uruguay, with Central America having the most concentrated amount of species. Species are found year-around in the Central United States and the Eastern United States down to the neotropics. Cardinalids found in the West Indies are non-breeding migrants and those in the Western United States and Canada are breeding migrants. The western tanager is the northernmost species in the family, with their breeding ranges occurring in the southern portions of the Northwest Territories. The northern cardinal has been introduced in Hawaii and Bermuda. They occupy a variety of habitats from forests to grassland and arid scrubland. Most North American cardinalid species migrate south for the winter, whether further south in the continent or extending into the neotropics, except the northern cardinal and pyrrhuloxia which stay year-round. The neotropical species are residential year-round in their range.

Feeding ecology

Cardinals, the dickcissel, seedeaters, buntings, and grosbeaks have the thicker, seed-crushing bills that enabled them to feed heavily on fruits and seeds outside of the breeding season (especially in the winter for northern species like the aforementioned dickcissel and northern cardinal). Once their breeding season begins, members of this group will supplement themselves with invertebrate prey, vital when raising their young and refueling their energetic costs of reproduction and other daily activities. The genera Chlorothraupis, Habia, Piranga, and Granatellus have slightly longer and less deep bills, which their diet mostly consists of insects, fruit, nectar and sap, less so on seeds. Cardinalids typically forage alone low level or on the ground, though some like Piranga and grosbeaks will forage high in the tree canopy. Many will come to birdfeeders especially during the winter.

Breeding and reproduction

Nearly all cardinalids are monogamous breeders and are highly territorial. Despite being monogamous this is only during the breeding season, and each year the birds might partner up with a different bird. The only exception is the dickcissel which is a polygynous species which nest in dense grasses and sedges. Other non-monogamous species include the lazuli and painted buntings which perform extra-copulation with multiple partners. The family is known for their intense brilliant songs. In some species like the lazuli bunting and indigo bunting the bird learn singing by match-based, meaning that first year breeding males will learn by copying the songs of nearby males, as opposed of learning it while they are in the nest. Even more unusual is the females of a few species, such as the scarlet tanager, northern cardinal, pyrrhuloxia, and black-headed grosbeak, which sing as well. In temperate species the breeding season is occurs annual while in tropical species it is year-around. The breeding seasons is in sync with the abundance of insects. Most species build open-cup nests made of grasses and twigs depending on the species. These nests would be in the trees, often high up in the crown. The nest building is done by both partners or by the female alone. The male and female take turns incubating the nest, often the male would feed the female. In a clutch on average there are 1 to 6 six eggs, with tropical species laying the fewest. Cardinalids produce one to three broods per season. As with other passerines, the young are born altricial and fledged between one and two weeks.

Conservation

As of 2021, the IUCN Red List has nearly 82 percent of cardinalids to be least concern. However, there are a handful of species that are of conservation concern. The rose-bellied bunting is an endemic near-threatened species as they are found in a small area of Oaxaca and Chiapas, Mexico; the black-cheeked ant-tanager is another endemic species found in Osa Peninsula in Costa Rica and the carrizal seedeater a critically endangered species found in the spiny bamboo thickets in the understory of deciduous forest in a remote southeastern corner of Venezuela. All of these species are threatened with habitat loss and the confinement within their much smaller range. The IUCN has not yet reevaluate the other species of seedeaters in the genus Amaurospiza.

Despite the vast majority of species being classified as least concern, there has been a growing concern in how the ongoing climate crisis will affect the distribution and migration of many species across the globe. One study led by Dr. Brooke L. Bateman published in July 2020 focused on the risk North American birds will face from climate change and the measures needed to protect them. The first study assessed 604 species from the United States found that if the planet warmed by 3.0 degrees Celsius many species, especially arctic birds, waterbirds, and boreal and western forest birds, will be highly vulnerable to climate change and future conservation efforts will need to be in place. Among the species sampled, the North American species of Piranga and Pheucticus are found to be most climate vulnerable of the cardinalids. These species will either lose some substantial amount of their range or they will migrate up north to escape the sudden change in their habitat.

A possible extinct species is the controversial Townsend's bunting, a supposed enigmatic species related to the dickcissel. The Townsend's bunting is only known from a single type specimen collected from Chester County, Pennsylvania by John Kirk Townsend and described by John James Audubon in 1834. The specimen is housed in the National Museum of Natural History. Genetic work has not been done on this bird, but observation of the plumage has been done. The controversy stems from the uncertainty from authors whether the bird is an extinct species, a rare color-variant of the dickcissel, or a hybrid female dickcissel and male blue grosbeak. If the bird is indeed simply a dickcissel it lacks any of the known field characteristics seen in the species in all life stages and sexes.

References

External links

Cardinalidae videos, photos and sounds on the Internet Bird Collection
Cardinalidae sounds on xeno-canto.org
Northern cardinal (bird information) on petinfospot.com
Northern cardinal, including sound and video clips, on Cornell Lab of Ornithology

 

Taxa named by Robert Ridgway